is a Japanese song whose lyrics are based on a chōka poem by Ōtomo no Yakamochi in the Man'yōshū (poem 4094), an eighth century anthology of Japanese poetry, set to music by Kiyoshi Nobutoki.

History
The poem is part of Ōtomo no Yakamochi's famous long poem celebrating the imperial edict on the discovery of gold in Michinoku province (modern Tohoku) in 749. The distant ancestors of the Ōtomo clan were known as masters of the royal Kume guard.
The poem reflects their pledge to serve their sovereign.

"Umi Yukaba" later became popular among the military, especially with the Imperial Japanese Navy. As set to music in 1937 by  it became popular during and also after World War II.  After Japan surrendered in 1945, "Umi Yukaba" and other gunka were banned by the Allied occupation forces. With the ending of the occupation, the song has now been widely played across military circles in Japan, including performances by the Japan Maritime Self-Defense Force.

Prior to Nobutoki’s composition, the poem had been set to music in the trio section of the Gunkan kōshinkyoku.

Lyrics
Umi yukaba / Mizuku kabane /
Yama yukaba / Kusa musu kabane/
Ookimi no / he ni koso shiname /
Kaerimi wa seji

At sea be my body water-soaked,On land be it with grass overgrown.
Let me die by the side of my Sovereign!Never will I look back.

In popular culture
 Umi Yukaba is also the name of a 1983 Japanese film.
 "Umi Yukaba" is featured in the 1970 film, Tora! Tora! Tora!.

See also

 Man'yōshū
 "Kimigayo"

References

External links
 Umi Yukaba from Victory in the Pacific, PBS documentary on World War II
 Kiyoshi Nobutoki Research guide in Japanese only
 Nihonkai daikaisen: Umi yukaba from IMDB
 The Emperor and Empress's Visit to Saipan account of an elderly Chamorro man singing Umi yukaba

Japanese poems
Japanese songs
Japanese patriotic songs
Death in Japan
1937 songs
Songs based on poems